Triodanis biflora is a species of flowering plant native to the Americas and known commonly as small Venus' looking-glass. The flower is solitary and has a bell-shaped blue or purple corolla. Its leaf arrangement is alternate and its leaf type is simple.  Its leaves are thin, serrate and sessile.

References

External links
Jepson Manual Treatment: Triodanis biflora
Triodanis biflora — U.C. Photo gallery

Campanuloideae
Flora of Canada
Flora of the Northwestern United States
Flora of the Southwestern United States
Flora of California
Flora of the Sierra Nevada (United States)
Natural history of the California chaparral and woodlands
Flora without expected TNC conservation status